Tropical Depression Fourteen was the last tropical depression of the 1987 Atlantic hurricane season and was the third most destructive storm of the year. The depression formed on October 31, 1987, in the Caribbean Sea, heading along a northward path into the southern Gulf of Mexico and into Florida until the system was absorbed on November 4. The path and damage from the depression followed a similar path to Hurricane Floyd earlier in October. However, certain barometric readings have considered that the depression may have become a tropical storm.

The depression in the time affected several cities and parishes in Jamaica and Cuba, along with causing significant rainfall in southern Florida. Jamaica was the area hardest hit by the depression, claiming the lives of six people and causing about $1.802 million (1987 USD, $3 million in 2009 USD) in damage. The depression caused floods that washed out villages, roads and bridges and caused dozens of landslides on the island. The island also had several rivers overflow including the Rio Minho and Rio Dogna. The damage caused by the tropical depression was comparable to previous flood in June 1986.

Meteorological history

Prior to the formation of Tropical Depression Fourteen, the southern Caribbean Sea was under a large area of low pressure. On October 30, satellite imagery showed that the area of pressure was beginning to form into a tropical disturbance. A reconnaissance aircraft was scheduled for the next morning to investigate the forming system, but by 1400 UTC on October 31, the National Hurricane Center in Miami, Florida had upgraded the system to a tropical depression based on the imagery and surface data. At this time, the specialists at the Hurricane Center believed that this was its most developed stage of its lifetime.

The depression began a movement to the northwest upon formation and on the night of October 31, the depression ran into a newly forming upper-level low near the Yucatan Peninsula. The interaction with the upper-level low caused shearing in the depression, and broke apart the previous low-level circulation that was developing. By the morning of November 1, the depression was nothing more than a swirl of low-level clouds near the center of circulation. After this, the depression could no longer attain the circulation it had previously developed. During the period of November 2 and 3, the depression moved to the northeast, crossing over the islands of Jamaica, Cayman and Cuba and then entering the southern parts of the Gulf of Mexico.

A similar report was filed at the Air Force Station at Cudjoe Key. After another reconnaissance flight was sent out to study the system, and recorded that surface area temperatures had dropped, the flight-level winds had reached  and the surface area pressure had reached . In the evening and overnight hours of November 3, the tropical depression continued to the northeast, making landfall in Florida at a location near Tampa Bay. The depression crossed Florida, weakening significantly, and becoming extratropical. After emerging from land in the Atlantic Ocean on November 5, the depression had become a low pressure area once again and was last spotted that day near the Carolina Capes.

Preparations and impact
In the United States, the National Hurricane Center issued two tropical storm warnings in Florida. The first was from the middle and lower islands of the Florida Keys to the area of Dry Tortugas on November 1. The warning lasted only 24 hours, with the warning ending on November 2. The second issued tropical storm warning was from the area of Fort Myers Beach to Cedar Key on November 3. This also lasted only 24 hours and was discontinued on November 3. Forecasters also suggested on November 2 that boaters should avoid the area in or around Key Largo.

Wind gusts from Tropical Depression Fourteen exceeded  near the Cudjoe Key Air Force Base on November 3. The highest recorded winds over Cuba reached  in the capital city of Havana. There were no gusts reported in Cuba however.

As the depression was moving to the west of the island of Jamaica, it caused significant rainfall on several parts of the island. The significant rainfall caused major damage and issues on the island, with an estimated 1,000+ people being displaced from their homes and being placed into government shelters. Several residential communities were totally underwater from the rainfall, with local roads being washed away from landslides and floodwater, but these were restored quickly. The government of Jamaica also reported that three bridges were washed away from the heavy rain and resulting floods. According to the government, the country received $587,500 (1987 USD) of damage to the highways and streets, $11,000 (1987 USD) to the utilities around the island, $836,000 (1987 USD) to the agriculture system and about $372,000 to the health system. The total damage reached $1.802 million (1987 USD, $3 million in 2009 USD) on the island of Jamaica alone. There were also six recorded fatalities from the system.

Rainfalls above  were reported in eastern Georgia, southern South Carolina, eastern Mississippi and eastern Alabama. Rainfalls in other areas went unrecorded. Outside the damage in Jamaica, the damage to Cuba and the United States were minimal, with no other reported casualties.

See also

 List of Florida hurricanes
 1935 Jérémie hurricane
 Hurricane Gustav (2008)
 Tropical Storm Nicole (2010)

References

External links
 Detailed information on all storms from 1987
 Tropical Depression 14 Information (HPC)

14 1987
1987 Atlantic hurricane season
Hurricanes in Jamaica
Hurricanes in Cuba
Hurricanes in Florida
14